Wojciech Rajski (born 9 July 1948) is a Polish conductor, and the founder and current Artistic Director of the Polish Chamber Philharmonic Orchestra Sopot. His recordings can be heard on such labels as Deutsche Grammophon, Dux Records, and EMI Classics.

References

External links 
 
 

1948 births
Living people
Polish conductors (music)
Male conductors (music)
21st-century conductors (music)
21st-century male musicians